Kanth Kaler (born 7 May 1972), popularly known as Kanth Kaler is an Indian singer who is famous for singing Punjabi sad songs. His hit songs include Hun Teri Nigah Badal Gai, Dass Asi Kehra Tere Bina Mar Challea, Udikan, and Teri Yaad Sajna.

Personal life
He was born at Nakodar, Jalandhar, Punjab, India. His original name being Sunny Nijjar, he changed his name after being advice by his spiritual Guru Baba Murad Shah to place the Kanth (voice) before all.

He recorded his first album Hun teri nigah badal gayi with the help of famous lyricist Kumar Dhaliwal and Madan Jalandhari, who was really impressed by his voice.

Albums
Ik Saah
Fanna
Armaan
Tere Bin
Aadat
Sadhra
Doriya
Intezar
Tu Chete Ave
Teri Yaad Sajna
Teri Akh Vairne
Dhol Janiya
Hun Teri Nigah Badal Gai
Pichhon Mukar Na Javi
Sad Songs – Vol. 9
Anmol – The Priceless
Daaru penda
Armaan-the endless quest of love
Fanaa
Jai Bhim, dedicated to Dr. B.R. Ambedkar
Asin Udhde Aasre Tere
Sher Da Yaar (Music By: Tru-Skool/Label: MovieBox)

Devotional
Kaashi Vich Rehan Walia
Meri Vasadi Paharan Wich Maaye
Sade Naina Vich Guru Ravidass Vasia
Kaashi Wale Guru
Dhan Dhan Khalsa
Haq 
Delhi – The Army Of 1984
Putt Guru Ravidas De

Awards
He was honoured with the ‘Sandhu Singh Hardam Award’ in 2018.

Honoured with Mirchi Music Awards Punjabi in 2018

References

Bhangra (music) musicians
Indian male singers
Living people
1972 births